A guitarist (or a guitar player) is a person who plays the guitar. Guitarists may play a variety of guitar family instruments such as classical guitars, acoustic guitars, electric guitars, and bass guitars. Some guitarists accompany themselves on the guitar by singing or playing the harmonica, or both.

Techniques
The guitarist may employ any of several methods for sounding the guitar, including finger picking, depending on the type of strings used (either nylon or steel), and including strumming with the fingers, or a guitar pick made of bone, horn, plastic, metal, felt, leather, or paper, and melodic flatpicking and finger-picking.

The guitarist may also employ various methods for selecting notes and chords, including fingering, thumbing, the barre (a finger lying across many or all strings at a particular fret), and guitar slides, usually made of glass or metal. These left- and right-hand techniques may be intermixed in performance.

Notable guitarists

Rock, metal, jazz, country and blues
Several magazines and websites have compiled what they intend as lists of the greatest guitarists—for example The 100 Greatest Guitarists of All Time by Rolling Stone magazine, or 100 Greatest Guitarists of All Time by Guitar World magazine.

Rolling Stone
The first in this list is the American guitarist Jimi Hendrix, introduced by Pete Townshend, guitarist for the Who, who was, in his turn, ranked at #10 in the list.

In describing the list to readers, Paul MacInnes from British newspaper The Guardian wrote, "Surprisingly enough for an American magazine, the top 10 is fair jam-packed with Yanks", though he also noted three exceptions in the top 10. The online magazine Blogcritics criticized the list for introducing some allegedly undeserving guitarists while forgetting some artists the writer considered perhaps more worthy, such as Johnny Marr, Al Di Meola, Phil Keaggy or John Petrucci.

In 2011, Rolling Stone updated the list, which this time was chosen by a panel of guitarists and other experts with the top 100 consisting of Eric Clapton, Eddie Van Halen, Keith Richards and Tony Iommi. Artists who had not been included in the previous list were added. Rory Gallagher, for example, was ranked in 57th place.

The 100 Greatest Guitarists of All Time is mentioned in many biographies about artists who appear in the list.

Guitar World
Guitar World, a monthly music magazine devoted to the guitar, also published their list of 100 greatest guitarists in the book Guitar World Presents the 100 Greatest Guitarists of All Time from the Pages of Guitar World Magazine. Different from the Rolling Stone list, which listed guitarists in descending order, Guitar World divided guitarists by music genre—such as "Lords of Hard Rock" for hard rock artists or "Jazzmen" for jazz players. Despite the appearance in other magazines like Billboard, this publication by Guitar World was criticized for including no female musicians within its selection. However, Guitar World recently published a list of "Eight Amazing Female Acoustic Players", including Kaki King, Muriel Anderson and Sharon Isbin.

Time and others
Following the death of Les Paul, Time website presented their list of 10 greatest artists in electric guitar. As in Rolling Stone magazine's list, Jimi Hendrix was chosen as the greatest guitarist followed by Slash from Guns N' Roses, B.B. King, Keith Richards, Jimmy Page, and Eric Clapton. Gigwise.com, an online music magazine, also ranks Jimi Hendrix as the greatest guitarist ever, followed by Jimmy Page, B.B. King, Keith Richards and Kirk Hammett.

Other genres

The classical guitar is strung with gut or nylon strings on top and wound basses for the lower strings. It was often ornately decorated with mother of pearl. Many early classical guitarists played with their finger tips only but later guitarists play with a combination of finger nail and flesh to project a clear sound and allowing for many different changes in sound quality (or timbre). This guitar tradition dates back at least to the seventeenth and eighteenth centuries, when a four course instrument was popular among aristocrats. In the early nineteenth century there the guitar enjoyed a surge of popularity when composer/performers such as Fernando Sor, Napoléon Coste, Mauro Giuliani, and many others published thousands of pieces for the concert hall and home gatherings. The classical guitar enjoyed another period of popularity in the twentieth century when recordings amplified the relatively quiet instrument. There are many classical guitarists listed as notable in their respective epochs.

One of the most renowned flamenco guitarists in recent decades was Paco de Lucía. Flamenco music is a popular traditional music associated with the Andalucia region of southern Spain. It is characterized by intricate syncopated rhythms intimately informed by a gypsy dance style. Flamenco guitarists also often accompany flamenco singers performing "cante jondo" (deep song). De Lucía was also one of the first to have successfully crossed over into other genres of music such as classical and jazz.

The cuatro guitar is a family of Latin American string instruments played in Puerto Rico, Venezuela and other Latin American countries. It is derived from the Spanish guitar. Although some have viola-like shapes, most cuatros resemble a small to mid-sized classical guitar. In Puerto Rico and Venezuela, the cuatro is an ensemble instrument for secular and religious music, and is played at parties and traditional gatherings. Christian Nieves is a Puerto Rican cuatro player and is recognized by the Institute of Puerto Rican culture as the most talented young of their national instrument, the Puerto Rican cuatro.

References

External links

 
Occupations in music